"Oj, Jelena, Jelena, jabuka zelena" is a well known Croatian folk song. In English the title means "Oh, Helen, Helen, green apple of mine".

It has been claimed that the main theme of the finale of Joseph Haydn's "London" symphony (No. 104 in D major) is based on this song.

For general discussion of the appearance of Croatian folk songs in Haydn's music, see Haydn and folk music.

References

 A CROATIAN COMPOSER, 1897, London (Seely and co. limited) by Sir William Henry Hadow (1859-1937)

External links
http://www.hr/darko/etf/hadow.html.  Excerpts from Hadow's book.
https://web.archive.org/web/20051127153029/http://members.chello.at/lagraf1/Amerikalied/Kroatische-Lieder/Oj-Jelena.htm 

Croatian folk songs